The 1925 Detroit Panthers season was their third in the league and first season as the Panthers. The team improved on their previous output of 1–5–1, winning eight games. They finished third in the league. The Panthers played in the first Wednesday game in NFL history against the Cleveland Bulldogs, and won 22–13. Future Pro Football Hall of Famer Jimmy Conzelman scored two touchdowns in the first quarter.

Schedule

Standings

Players
Bill Bucher, kicker, 1 game, 180 pounds, 5-10, Clarkson
Jimmy Conzelman, tailback, 12 games, 175 pounds, 6-0, Washington (MO)
Al Crook, center, 8 games, 190 pounds, 5-10, Washington & Jefferson
Dinger Doane, fullback, 11 games, 190 pounds, 5-10, Tufts
Walt Ellis, tackle, 1 game, 224 pounds, 5-11, Univ. of Detroit
Jack Fleischman, guard, 9 games, 184 pounds, 5-6, Purdue
Al Hadden, back, 12 games, 186 pounds, 5-9, Washington & Jefferson
Tom Hogan, tackle, 11 games, 193 pounds, 6-2, Univ. of Detroit, Fordham		
Vivian Hultman, end, 11 games, 178 pounds, 5-8, Michigan St.
Dutch Lauer, tailback, 11 games, 185 pounds, 5-10, Univ. of Detroit	
Dutch Marion, fullback, 10 games, 180 pounds, 5-9, Washington & Jefferson, Michigan	
Tom McNamara, guard, 12 games, 210 pounds, 5-10, Tufts, Univ. of Detroit
Russ Smith, guard, 9 games, 220 pounds, 5-10, Navy, Southern Illinois, Illinois
Gus Sonnenberg, tackle, 12 games, 196 pounds, 5-6, Dartmouth, Univ. of Detroit
Dick Vick, back, 11 games, 167 pounds, 5-9, Washington & Jefferson
Ernie Vick, center, 10 games, 190 pounds, 5-10, Michigan
Tillie Voss, end, 10 games, 207 pounds, 6-3, Univ. of Detroit
By Wimberly, tackle, 11 games, 200 pounds, 6-2, Washington & Jefferson

References

Detroit Panthers seasons
Detroit Panthers
Detroit Panthers